The 4th constituency of Fejér County is one of the single member constituencies of the National Assembly, the national legislature of Hungary. The constituency standard abbreviation: Fejér 04. OEVK.

Since 2022, it has been represented by Lajos Mészáros of the Fidesz–KDNP party alliance.

Geography
The 4th constituency is located in eastern part of Fejér County.

List of municipalities
The constituency includes the following municipalities:

Members
The constituency was first represented by Dénes Galambos of the Fidesz from 2014 to 2018. In the 2018 election Tamás Pintér of the Jobbik was elected representative until the 2019 Hungarian local elections. In this election Pintér was elected the mayor of Dunaújváros. Due to the incompatibility of its representatives and the mayor's mandate, a by-election had to be announced. In the by-election of 2020 Gergely Kálló of the Jobbik was elected representative. He was succeeded by Lajos Mészáros of the Fidesz in 2022.

Notes

References

Fejér 4th